Richard Ibbetson was Archdeacon of Exeter from 11 November 1726 until his death on 1 September 1731.

Ibbetson was  born at Ledston in the West Riding of Yorkshire and educated at University College, Oxford. He became a Fellow of Oriel College, Oxford in 1700; Rector of Hadleigh, Suffolk in 1714; Rector of Lambeth in 1718;Prebendary and Canon Residentiary of Exeter Cathedral in 1716; and  its Precentor in 1723.  He died at Hackington.

References

1679 births
People from Ledston
Alumni of University College, Oxford
Fellows of Oriel College, Oxford
Archdeacons of Exeter
1731 deaths
Clergy from Leeds